A Beautiful Planet is a 2016 American documentary film directed, written, and produced by Toni Myers, and narrated by actress Jennifer Lawrence. It was originally released exclusively for IMAX theatres. Created in cooperation with the National Aeronautics and Space Administration (NASA), the documentary utilizes footage recorded by astronauts aboard the International Space Station (ISS) over the course of fifteen months. The documentary examines how astronauts lives and work on a daily basis. The astronauts are representing the respective space agencies of the United States, Russia, Europe, and Japan.

The documentary premiered in Manhattan, in New York City, on April 16, 2016, and made its theatrical debut on April 29, 2016. The film was first aired domestically in the United States, grossing $15.6 million. It was later aired in the United Kingdom, Australia, New Zealand and Russia/CIS.

Content overview
A Beautiful Planet utilizes large-scale cinema screens to display capital cities illuminated by skyglow, lightning storms seen above clouds, Super Typhoon Maysak as seen from its eye, polar auroras viewed from low Earth orbit, the Great Lakes of North America locked in ice and snow, and reefs below the surface of the Caribbean Sea.

The big picture 
The film depicts views of space from the International Space Station (ISS) of geographical formations that may not be visible from land such as annular lake, Lake Manicouagan in Quebec, Canada.

Scenes from the documentary show a snow-capped segment of South America's Andes, the longest continental mountain range in the world. The Andes stretch from Venezuela north of the Equator, through the Tropics, and down to southern Argentina, and contain "some of the most extreme climate zones on earth. All between "ice fields and deserts". The Andean Mountains includes Aconcagua, the highest peak in The Americas, as well as the highest in the Southern Hemisphere.

The movie presents Earth's driest and wettest areas with an overhead sequence of the Namib Desert on the east cleft by the Atlantic Ocean's Skeleton Coast in the west. The film repeats the consensus that the Namib is the "oldest desert" on Earth, having a desert climate longer than any other region in the world, and being around tens of millions of year longer than the Sahara.

The film begins with a light-years-long, computer-generated trip through swarms of stars in the Milky Way; the compressed trip ends with the Solar System.

The film uses time-lapse photography to depict how Earth's warming climate is causing the Greenland ice sheet to melt, using footage of the Jakobshavn Glacier calving.

A Beautiful Planet also presents images of large-scale deforestation in Madagascar. The film shows how this island suffers from widespread soil erosion and habitat destruction of the island's native wildlife, such as the lemur. A Beautiful Planet also shows images of the burning of the Brazilian rainforest.

The film depicts multiple scenes of climate change and environmental degradation. Filmmaker Toni Myers told the Los Angeles Times, "I wanted to inspire people especially as to how beautiful the planet is, how fragile it is, how complex and diverse and varied it is ... Most of all I wanted to show why we want to find solutions to look after our planet. It's our only one."

Exoplanet Kepler-186f 
The final scenes of A Beautiful Planet briefly examine an extrasolar planet (a planet outside of our planetary system), which was discovered in 2014. The planet, Kepler-186f, was the first approximately-Earth-sized planet found to be orbiting within its star's habitable zone. The orbital area where liquid water could conceivably exist without freezing or vaporizing. It was the first discovery of an Earth-sized planet on which life could reside.

The name "Kepler" comes from its discovery by the Kepler Space Telescope, or "NASA Discovery Mission Number 10," a spacecraft observatory which is designed to find exoplanets in our region of the Milky Way Galaxy that are Earth-sized and smaller, and that are within the habitable zone. The planet orbits Kepler-186, a red dwarf star about half the size and mass of the Sun which lies in the direction of the constellation Cygnus, about 500 light-years away. The number "186" in the planet's name refers to the order in which its planetary system was discovered while scientists processed all of the data produced by the Kepler Space Telescope.

Although the idea of interstellar travel to another planetary system like Kepler-186f is not feasible given current astronautics technology, some spaceflight futurists (like Samantha Cristoforetti) find value in speculating about the currently-impossible.

The astronauts
The film's cast consist of ISS crew from many nations. The astronauts who appeared in the movie included:
Scott Kelly (NASA / USA), who spent an 11-month uninterrupted stint aboard the International Space Station; Samantha Cristoforetti (European Space Agency / Italy), who has spent more time in an uninterrupted spaceflight than any other European astronaut; Barry "Butch" Wilmore (NASA / USA), commander of the 42nd expedition to the ISS from November 10, 2014, to March 11, 2015; Terry Virts (NASA / USA), commander of the 43rd expedition to the ISS from March 11, 2015, to June 11, 2015; Anton Shkaplerov (Roscosmos / Russia), the commander of the Soyuz spacecraft that brought Cristoforetti and Virts to the Space Station; Kjell Lindgren (NASA / USA), a medical doctor who had previously worked as a flight surgeon supporting medical operations and space-station training at NASA's Johnson Space Center, and Kimiya Yui (Japan Aerospace Exploration Agency / Japan), a space explorer who was made Head of the JAXA Astronaut Group after he returned from his stay on the Space Station.

Research lab 
The International Space Station is a scientific laboratory, and many of the experiments on the ISS have the astronauts themselves as research participants to determine how spaceflight affects the human body. On March 28, 2015 Scott Kelly and Mikhail Kornienko arrived at the Space Station to commence a much-discussed one year mission to study the health effects of long-term space travel. Scientists hoped to analyze their mission and discover ways future space explorers might adjust to the effects of weightlessness, isolation, radiation exposure, and stress they would encounter in a 30-month-round-trip expedition to Mars, or in an even longer trip beyond Mars. Shortly after Kelly's arrival at the Space Station, A Beautiful Planet shows him participating in an initial examination of his eye, to study and correct any vision decline reported by many astronauts.

Scott Kelly has an identical twin, Mark Kelly, who is also a retired NASA astronaut. The brothers agreed to be the subjects of an unprecedented twin study; Mark stayed on Earth during Scott's eleven months aboard the ISS so that researchers could examine how an extended spaceflight affected Scott's body compared to Mark's. While Scott was in space and then continuing after he returned, both twins gave periodic blood samples and DNA swabs, and they underwent body scans and many other medical tests. In the epilogue to his 2017 book about the year long mission, Scott wrote that the very preliminary assessments of the data from the mission and from the twin study were promising:

In the taste test phase of an experiment with space farming, Kelly and his fellow Expedition 44 crew-members Kjell Lindgren and Kimiya Yui are shown sampling red romaine lettuce that was grown in the Space Station's "Veggie" (or Vegetable Production) System. The Veggie series of experiments are designed to ensure that future explorers visiting the Moon, Mars or an asteroid have access to fresh produce, and also to provide them with an opportunity for relaxation and relief from stress or boredom.

Earth observatory 

A Beautiful Planet provides close-up footage of the Cupola, a domed, 360 degree observation bay on the nadir (Earth-facing) side of the Station's Tranquility module / Node 3. It has seven windows in total, with six outwardly-angled windows arranged around a central, circular window which faces directly toward Earth. The circular window measures 80 centimeters in diameter; it is the largest window ever sent into space. Many scenes were filmed from the Cupola, and the astronauts themselves are shown taking photographs and gazing through its windows at views of Earth.

The Cupola was constructed by the European Space Agency for the utilitarian purpose of giving astronauts a workstation where they could observe the Earth, the exterior of the Station, visiting vehicles, and the operation of the ISS robotic arms. It also serves as a rejuvenation area where astronauts can relax and seek inspiration, including communicating with other crew members.

Training facility
Much of the "training facility" aspect of the ISS mission is geared toward providing practical experience so that astronauts, space agencies, aerospace engineers and scientists are prepared for much longer space missions, including a possible human presence on Mars or the Moon.

Astronauts on the Space Station are required to spend approximately two hours each day engaged in physical training to prevent loss of bone density, muscle atrophy, and weightlessness. In the documentary, Terry Virts is shown receiving a cardiovascular workout by running on an ISS treadmill and Samantha Cristoforetti does strength training using an ISS exercise machine that mimics weightlifting exercises. Both machines have adaptations that permit them to function in a micro-g environment. The treadmill has a harness and bungee cord straps that keep astronaut runners from floating away from it, and the "weightlifting" machine replaces the weights (which don't "weigh" anything in orbit) with two canisters that create small vacuums against which exercising astronauts can pull.

The Space Station is positioned in low Earth orbit. This is just outside of the Earth's appreciable atmosphere, and provides a training area in which astronauts can put on space suits, leave the ISS life support systems behind, and conduct spacewalks - or "Extravehicular activity (EVA)." An EVA may be undertaken to make repairs, reconfigure the Station to accommodate new modules and deploy new equipment. The ISS orbits high enough to permit an astronaut and their sponsoring nation to gain an EVA experience outside of the atmosphere. However, it is low enough to avoid the increased radiation exposure and prevent difficulties associated with climbing further out of Earth's gravity well. (If the Earth is compared to a 16-inch beach ball, the orbit of the ISS would be about half an inch above the beach ball's surface.)

Butch Wilmore and Terry Virts performed three spacewalks over a nine-day period from February 21 to March 1, 2015. The film depicts some of their EVA activities outside the Space Station. While they worked, both explorers were cognizant of the dangers associated with spacewalks. Virts explains that a puncture to their EMU spacesuits was a particular concern because "you 'walk around' by grabbing onto things with your gloves ... The outside of the Space Station [is] a jungle of wires and equipment and metal bars and trusses. If you accidentally sliced your glove or your spacesuit on one of the sharp edges, that could create a leak, and if that leak were big enough, you would die." Describing some of the other EVA hazards, Wilmore elaborates that the temperature is "almost 300 degrees [Fahrenheit] on the Sun side of the Space Station, [but when] you get in the shade, it's minus 275 degrees. You feel that inside the suit. My fingertips in the sunlight would feel like they were on fire almost ... [Also,] you have a safety tether attached to the Station, and it's on a reel ... You can be upside down, twisted, inverted; you can completely lose your spatial awareness about where you are and what your altitude is, and you can easily get tangled up in that safety tether if you're not cautious. Every single movement you make, you're making an effort to think [things] through."

Production
A Beautiful Planet was written, produced, and directed by Toni Myers, who has created seven other space-themed IMAX films including Hubble 3D and Space Station 3D. The film premiered in Manhattan on April 16, 2016, and was released in cinemas on April 29, 2016. Despite being announced as distributor, Walt Disney Studios later removed association with the film prior to its release.

Digital IMAX cameras

The astronauts who filmed the movie used digital IMAX cameras, and much of the footage they produced was shot through the seven window panes on the Space Station's domed Cupola module. The use of digital cameras permitted cinematographer James Neihouse to review image sequences almost immediately and make suggestions for retakes, and was a lightweight alternative to using IMAX film which can be developed only when returned from space.

Myers and Neihouse coordinated with their astronaut camera crew to make use of the digital cameras' augmented capacity for filming in dim light. According to Myers, "We would not have the nighttime scenes without the digital dynamic range ... What the digital capture did was totally open up that night world to us, with stars, cities at night, lightning and other phenomena that you see at night, like aurora."

Reception
This movie received a 100% rating on Rotten Tomatoes and a 79% audience-enjoyment rating from the 13 reviews.

The film's ratings and reviews were mostly centered around its cinematography. A review in the British newspaper, The Guardian called it a "large-format eye-opener [which] achieves a breathtaking new perspective on Earthly life," while another appraisal in The New York Times asked, "how can your eyes not bug out when given 3-D views of Earth, taken from space, on a stories-high [IMAX] screen?"

See also

List of films featuring space stations

References

External links
 A Beautiful Planet official website
 

2016 films
Documentary films about the space program of the United States
Documentary films about outer space
Films about astronauts
Films shot in space
IMAX short films
2016 3D films
2016 documentary films
American 3D films
3D short films
Earth in film
Documentary films about nature
Films directed by Toni Myers
IMAX documentary films
Films scored by Maribeth Solomon
Films scored by Micky Erbe
3D documentary films
2010s English-language films